{{Speciesbox
|image = Akinonogeshi.JPG
|image_caption = A typical flower
|genus = Lactuca
|species = indica
|authority = L. Mant. Pl. 2: 278. 1771.
|synonyms = *Brachyramphus sinicus Miq.Chondrilla squarrosa (Thunb.) Poir.Lactuca amurensis Regel & Maxim.Lactuca amurensis RegelLactuca bialata Griff.Lactuca brevirostris Champ.Lactuca brevirostris Champ. ex Benth.Lactuca cavaleriei H.Lév.Lactuca dracoglossa MakinoLactuca hoatiensis H.Lév. & VaniotLactuca kouyangensis H.Lév.Lactuca laciniata (Houtt.) MakinoLactuca mauritiana Poir.Lactuca squarrosa (Thunb.) Miq.Lactuca squarrosa (Thunb.) Maxim.Leontodon acutissimus NoronhaPrenanthes laciniata Houtt.Prenanthes squarrosa Thunb.Pterocypsela indica (L.) C.ShihPterocypsela indivisa (Makino) H.S.PakPterocypsela laciniata (Houtt.) C.Shih
| synonyms_ref= 
}}Lactuca indica, the Indian lettuce, is a species of plant in the tribe Cichorieae whin the family Asteraceae. It is native to western China (Xinjiang, Tibet), the Himalayas, and southwest Asia as far west as Turkey. It is widely introduced elsewhere, even as far as east Africa, and is thought toith rice cultivation. 

from a taproot to at least 40cm tall and often reaching 2m. Its flowers have white to pale yellow ray florets with yellower centers. The narrowness of the leaf blades and the degree of spikiness of leaf lobes varies greatly by region. 
 

It is cultivated (or rather, its growth is encouraged) as fodder for rabbits, pigs, poultry and even fish in Asia. Its young leaves can be, and are, consumed as a leaf vegetable in salads like other dandelions.n. 

See alsoLactuca sativa''

References

indica
Flora of Asia
Plants described in 1771